The men's road race at the 1972 UCI Road World Championships was the 39th edition of the event. The race took place on Sunday 6 August 1972 in Gap, France. The race was won by Marino Basso of Italy.

Final classification

References

Men's Road Race
UCI Road World Championships – Men's road race
1972 Super Prestige Pernod